Lake Entiat (also known as Rocky Reach Reservoir) is a reservoir between Chelan County and Douglas County in North Central Washington, USA, that is formed above Rocky Reach Dam (built 1962), a hydroelectric dam on the Columbia River. Lincoln Rock State Park is on its south shore.

Turtle Rock Island

A prominent feature in Lake Entiat is the 150-acre Turtle Rock Island, located northeast of Lincoln Rock State Park.  Originally part of the mainland on the south bank of the Columbia, this rocky outcrop became an island when the lake formed.  U.S. Highway 2 formerly ran through the area that became the island, and remnants of the road may still be seen in aerial photos. The island is now a nature preserve and fish hatchery, with access only by boat.

References

External links

Entiat
Entiat
Entiat
Protected areas of Douglas County, Washington
Protected areas of Chelan County, Washington